The 2007 Lafayette Leopards football team represented Lafayette College in the 2007 NCAA Division I FCS football season. The team was led by Frank Tavani, in his eighth season as head coach. The Leopards played their home games at Fisher Stadium in Easton, Pennsylvania. All games were televised on the Lafayette Sports Network (LSN).

Schedule

References

Lafayette
Lafayette Leopards football seasons
Lafayette Leopards football